Jonathan Patrick Sigalet (born February 12, 1986) is a Canadian professional ice hockey defenceman currently playing for Brynäs IF of the Swedish Hockey League (SHL). He was selected by the Boston Bruins in the fourth round (100th overall) of the 2005 NHL Entry Draft.

Playing career
As a youth, Sigalet played in the 2000 Quebec International Pee-Wee Hockey Tournament with a minor ice hockey team from Burnaby.

Amateur
Sigalet's career began with the BCHL's Salmon Arm Silverbacks in 2002. During his season with the team, he received numerous awards, including being named to the BCHL First-Team All-Star and All-Rookie teams, as well as being named "Top Defenceman" by the team.

Following his season in the BCHL, Sigalet joined the Bowling Green Falcons for the 2003–2004 season, joining his brother, goaltender Jordan Sigalet. Following a three-point night against Findlay on December 12, Sigalet was named CCHA Rookie of the Week on December 14, 2003. He concluded his freshman season with 3 goals, 12 assists and 26 penalty minutes, earning him an Honorable Mention for the CCHA All-Rookie Team.

During his sophomore season, Sigalet recorded 3 goals, 13 assists and 36 penalty minutes. In March 2005 he was named to the CCHA Scholar-Athlete Team for a GPA of 3.87 in Health Science.

Professional
Sigalet was Boston's fourth pick (100th overall) in the 2005 NHL Entry Draft. He officially signed with the Boston Bruins on August 15, 2005, foregoing his final two years of college eligibility and joining his brother in Boston's system. Jonathan played three seasons with the Bruins' minor league team, the Providence Bruins.

In his rookie season with Providence, Jonathan was the team's leading scorer among defensemen with 9 goals and 27 assists. He added 2 more goals and another assist in the playoffs. Following the season he was awarded, along with David Lundbohm, Providence’s Community Service Award. He was also named the team's recipient of the American Specialty/AHL Man of the Year Award for 2005–2006, in honor of his community service efforts.

Jonathan played his first NHL game on January 9, 2007 with the Boston Bruins in a 5–2 loss against the Ottawa Senators. He registered one shot, no points, four penalty minutes and a minus-two plus/minus rating.

On May 28, 2008 the Columbus Blue Jackets acquired the rights to Sigalet in a trade with the Bruins in exchange for the rights of forward Matt Marquardt.

In the summer of 2011, he signed for Lev Poprad, the newest expansion team in the Kontinental Hockey League and the first team in that league based outside of the territory of the former Soviet Union.

In May 2012, he signed for Slovan Bratislava, which had recently completed the move from the Slovak Extraliga to the KHL to become one of the newest teams in the KHL.

After parts of two seasons in the Swedish Hockey League with Luleå HF, on April 29, 2016, Sigalet moved to fellow competitors, Frölunda HC, on a three-year contract.

Career statistics

Regular season and playoffs

International

Awards and honours

References

External links
 

1986 births
Living people
Boston Bruins draft picks
Boston Bruins players
Bowling Green Falcons men's ice hockey players
Bowling Green State University alumni
Brynäs IF players
Canadian ice hockey defencemen
Canadian people of Swedish descent
Frölunda HC players
HC Lev Poprad players
Luleå HF players
Providence Bruins players
Ice hockey people from Vancouver
Springfield Falcons players
Syracuse Crunch players
Canadian expatriate ice hockey players in Slovakia
Canadian expatriate ice hockey players in Sweden
Canadian expatriate ice hockey players in the United States